Choroń  is a village in the administrative district of Gmina Poraj, within Myszków County, Silesian Voivodeship, in southern Poland.

The village has a population of 1,438.

References

Villages in Myszków County